The 1995 Nichirei International Championships was a women's tennis tournament played on outdoor hard courts at the Ariake Coliseum in Tokyo, Japan that was part of Tier II of the 1995 WTA Tour. It was the sixth edition of the tournament and was held from 19 September through 24 September 1995. Second-seeded Mary Pierce won the singles title.

Finals

Singles

 Mary Pierce defeated  Arantxa Sánchez Vicario 6–3, 6–3
 It was Pierce' 2nd singles title of the year and the 7th of her career.

Doubles

 Lindsay Davenport /  Mary Joe Fernández defeated  Amanda Coetzer /  Linda Wild 6–3, 6–2

References

External links
 ITF tournament edition details
 Tournament draws

Nichirei International Championships
Nichirei International Championships
1995 in Japanese tennis
1995 in Japanese women's sport